The Uslika Formation is a geologic formation in British Columbia. It preserves fossils dating back to the Cretaceous period.

See also 
 List of fossiliferous stratigraphic units in British Columbia

References

External links 
 

Cretaceous British Columbia
Aptian Stage